is  the Head coach of the Fukushima Firebonds in the Japanese B.League.

Head coaching record

|-
| style="text-align:left;"|Shimane Susanoo Magic
| style="text-align:left;"|2014-15
| 40||21||19|||| style="text-align:center;"|6th in Bj Western|||2||0||2||
| style="text-align:center;"|Lost in 1st round
|-
| style="text-align:left;"|Rizing Fukuoka
| style="text-align:left;"|2015-16
| 38||14||24|||| style="text-align:center;"|Fired|||-||-||-||
| style="text-align:center;"|-
|-
| style="text-align:left;"|Fukushima Firebonds
| style="text-align:left;"|2016-17
| 60||30||30|||| style="text-align:center;"|3rd in B2 Eastern|||-||-||-||
| style="text-align:center;"|-
|-
| style="text-align:left;"|Fukushima Firebonds
| style="text-align:left;"|2017-18
| 60||38||22|||| style="text-align:center;"|2nd in B2 Eastern|||-||-||-||
| style="text-align:center;"|-
|-
| style="text-align:left;"|Fukushima Firebonds
| style="text-align:left;"|2018-19
| 60||27||33|||| style="text-align:center;"|4th in B2 Eastern|||-||-||-||
| style="text-align:center;"|-
|-
| style="text-align:left;"|Fukushima Firebonds
| style="text-align:left;"|2019-20
| 47||16||31|||| style="text-align:center;"|5th in B2 Eastern|||-||-||-||
| style="text-align:center;"|-
|-

References

1984 births
Living people
Fukushima Firebonds coaches
Japanese basketball coaches
Osaka Evessa coaches
Rizing Zephyr Fukuoka coaches
Rizing Zephyr Fukuoka players
Shimane Susanoo Magic coaches